Elena Bogdan and Alexandra Cadanțu won the first edition of the tournament, defeating Çağla Büyükakçay and Karin Knapp in the final, 6–4, 3–6, [10–5].

Seeds

Draw

Draw

References
Main Draw

BRD Bucharest Openandnbsp;- Doubles
2014 Doubles